1952 Emperor's Cup Final was the 32nd final of the Emperor's Cup competition. The final was played at Fujieda Higashi High School Ground in Shizuoka on May 6, 1952. All Keio won the championship.

Overview
All Keio won the championship, by defeating Osaka Club 6–2. All Keio was featured a squad consisting of Yukio Tsuda, Ken Noritake, Hirokazu Ninomiya, Tadao Kobayashi and Yoshinori Shigematsu.

Match details

See also
1952 Emperor's Cup

References

Emperor's Cup
Emperor's Cup Final
Emperor's Cup Final